Mark Gertler may refer to:

 Mark Gertler (artist) (1891–1939), British portrait and landscape painter
 Mark Gertler (economist) (born 1951), American economist